Francisco José Ribeiro Lopes dos Santos, known mainly as Francisco Santos (born 17 May 1962 in Luanda, Angola) is an Angolan/Portuguese multi-talented artist. He is known by many names in various industries. As a swimmer, he uses the name, Francisco Lopes Santos. In visual arts, he is known as Xesko. In poetry, he used the name Elias Karipande. In fantasy and science fiction, Francisco used the name Alan J. Banta, whose works were published in English and Portuguese.

As a sportsman, he represented Angola in swimming at the 1980 Summer Olympics (Men's 100 m Breaststroke and Men's 4 × 100 m Medley Relay).

He represented his country in other international games, including the Algiers 1978 All-Africa Games, the Moscow 1979 Seventh USSR Summer Spartakiade, and the Mexico 1979 Summer Universiade.

He was honored by the Angolan Olympic Committee in 2014 for being one of the first Angolan Olympic ambassadors.

Biography
Francisco's parents were Portuguese, and immigrated to Angola in 1959, where he grew up immersed in the African quarters (musseques) of Luanda.

Since a young age, he was dedicated to the arts and sports. He began writing at 14 and painting at 16 years old (watercolours and Chinese Ink). In that time, he had published some short stories and poems in several magazines and newspapers.

In secondary school, he was the founder and publisher of the magazine "The Bantalas" entirely dedicated to the arts (Fine Art Painting, Photograph, Prose and Poetry). He participated in a contest of Art Painting whose objective was the creation of a poster commemorative of the anniversary of the People's Movement for the Liberation of Angola (MPLA) obtaining the 1st place.

In sports, he obtained several titles of National Champion, in Swimming (consecutively from 1972 to 1980) and Chess (1977 and 1979). He also represented his nation abroad several times, being the last time in the 1980 Summer Olympics (Moscow).

Francisco abandoned politics when he moved to Portugal in 1986. In Portugal, he began a career as a musician under the name of Francis Riba, having created several musical groups, the better known being the psychedelic rock band ZEM.

From 1982 to 1999, he was involved in several musical and theatrical projects as a technician, musician, producer and director, writing several adaptations and two original pieces.

He graduated in the Soviet Union in 1986 in Chemical Engineering, where he frequented the courses of "Scientific Drawing" and "Creative Thought in Post-Modernism". In Portugal, he graduated in Data Processing, Systems Engineering and Programming. He also frequented the Courses of “Improvement in Painting Techniques for Oil Portraits”, promoted by the Fine Art-Painter Master Almaia, “Photograph and Graphic Design”, from IADE (Institute of Visual Arts, Design and Marketing), “Aesthetics and Theories of the Contemporary Art" and "Art Painting and Visual intervention”, from SNBA (National Society of Fine Arts).

He has an MA of Contemporary Fine Arts from the Sheffield Institute of Arts (Sheffield Hallam University), Sheffield, England, and has several works displayed in public places and he is represented in several private and official collections in Portugal, Russia, France, Spain, Brazil, UK and Angola.

Works

Alan J. Banta
(Novel, Short story)

1976 – Exodus. 
1977 – Crossed fire I (A Travel to the Past) - Fogo Cruzado I (Uma Viagem ao Passado). 
1978 – Crossed fire II (Perhaps the Future) - Fogo Cruzado II (Talvez o Futuro). 
1979 – Crossed fire III (What Reality) - Fogo Cruzado III (Que Realidade). 
1981 – Zantar. 
1993 – Terrae Incognitae. 
1994 – Dreams (Short story) - Sonhos (Contos). 
1995 – Thoughts of Chom - Pensamentos de Chom.

Elias Karipande
(Poetry)

1982 – The Rainbow Warriors - Os Guerreiros do Arco-íris. 
1984 – From Kabinda to the Kunene - De Kabinda ao Kunene. 
1986 – 24 Hours in the Life (Finally the Peace) - 24 Horas na Vida (Finalmente a Paz). 
1988 – Green - Verde.

Xesko
(Poetry)

1986 – Putting the Points in the iis - Pontos nos iis. 
1989 – A Step in thin Ice - 1 Passo em Falso. 
1993 – Between God and the Devil - Entre Deus e o Diabo. 
1996 – Muses (A Lost Secret) - Musas (Um Segredo Perdido). 
2002 – Ambiguities - Ambiguidades. 
2006 – The Electric Zone of the Colors - A Zona Electrica das Cores. 

(Novel, Short story)

1998 – Cel, Angel or Demon - Cel, Anjo ou Demónio,

Selected exhibitions

Solo
 1981 - "Freedom" Scientific Institute of Minsk (Minsk/Bielorussia - Ex. Soviet Union)
 1982 - "Butterfly Effect" Humbi-Humbi, Art Gallery (Luanda/Angola)
 2004 - "7 Shades of Gray" Café da Ponte, Docas de Alcântara (Lisbon/Portugal)
 2008 - "E Pluribus Unum" First Gallery, (Lisbon/Portugal)
 2009 - "Devaneios/Reveries" Gallery Vasco da Gama, (Loures/Portugal)
 2010 - "Devaneios II/Reveries II" Gallery Fernado Pessoa, (Lisbon/Portugal)
 2011 - "Transições/Transitions" Gallery Fernado Pessoa, (Lisbon/Portugal)

Collective
 1978 - "Um Quadro para a Revolução" (A painting for the Revolution) Noble Room of the National Assembly (Luanda/Angola)
 2005 - Military Hospital of Belém (Lisbon/Portugal)
 2006 - "Coisas de Campolide" (Things about Campolide) (Lisbon/Portugal)
 2007 - "1st National Exhibition of Fine Arts" (Lisbon/Portugal).
 2007 - "Lembrar Abril" (Remember April - commemorations of 25th of April and the International Workers' Day) (Alcochete/Portugal)
 2007 - "Viver Campolide" (To live Campolide) (Lisbon/Portugal)
 2007/2008 - Arte Fora da Galeria (Art Outside the Gallery) (Alcochete/Portugal)
 2008 - "Os 5 Mágnificos" (The Magnificent 5) Tic Tac Café (Alcochete/Portugal)
 2009 - Puro Arte, (Vigo/Spain)
 2009 - Artexpo NY, (New York/U.S.)
 2009 - Art Meeting in London III, Gallery 118, (London/UK)
 2009 - Poésie Visuelle dans Paris II (Visual Poetry in Paris II), Galerie Artitude, (Paris/France)
 2009 - Galeria Aberta XVI (Open Gallery XVI), Museum "Jorge Vieira", (Beja/Portugal)
 2009 - Around the Bull - Gallery Vieira Portuense (Porto/Portugal)
 2010 - Transmission: Off Air, SIAD Gallery, (Sheffield/UK)
 2011 - Global Echo: Artists in Print, Furnival Gallery, (Sheffield/UK)
 2011 - Creative Sparks 2011, Furnival Gallery, (Sheffield/UK)

 2007/8/9/11 - Alcarte (Alcochete/Portugal)

See also

 Angola at the 1980 Summer Olympics
 Swimming at the 1980 Summer Olympics – Men's 4 × 100 metre medley relay
 Post-Modernism
 Contemporary art
 Modern poetry

References

Additional references
 Official Site
 DIÁRIO DE LUANDA, Luanda, Angola, (1968 to 1974), (Newspaper)
 PROVÍNCIA DE ANGOLA/JORNAL DE ANGOLA, Luanda, Angola, (1968 to 1981), (Newspaper)
 International Olympic Committee, (1980). Moscow '80, Moscow: Fizkulturai Sport Publishers'.
 Federação Portuguesa de Natação, (1984) “Ranking Nacional 82/83”, Lisboa: FPN.
 Federação Portuguesa de Natação, (1985) “Ranking Nacional 83/84”, Lisboa: FPN.
 Federação Portuguesa de Natação, (1986) “Ranking Nacional 84/85”, Lisboa: FPN.
 Federação Portuguesa de Natação, (1987) “Ranking Nacional 85/86”, Lisboa: FPN.
 Federação Portuguesa de Natação, (1988) “Ranking Nacional 86/87”, Lisboa: FPN.
 Federação Portuguesa de Natação, (1989) “Ranking Nacional 87/88”, Lisboa: FPN.
 RECORD, Lisboa, Portugal, (1982 to 1990), (Newspaper)

External links
 
  Men 100m Breaststroke Olympic Games Moscow
  Men 4x100m Medley Relay Olympic Games Moscow
  Sports Reference
  Official Olympic Reports
  Official Olympic Reports - Moscow 1980
  Saatchi Gallery
  Babele Arte 
  modelmayhem.com
 (Portuguese) SPA - Portuguese Society of Authors
 (Portuguese) APEL - Portuguese Association of Publishers and Booksellers
 (Portuguese) Jornal de Angola (Newspaper)
 (Portuguese) Record (Newspaper)

1962 births
Living people
Angolan male swimmers
Olympic swimmers of Angola
Swimmers at the 1980 Summer Olympics
20th-century Angolan poets
Angolan writers
20th-century Portuguese poets
Angolan male poets
Writers from Luanda
People from Lisbon
Angolan people of Portuguese descent
Alumni of Sheffield Hallam University
Sportspeople from Luanda
Angolan expatriates in the Soviet Union
21st-century Angolan poets
21st-century Portuguese poets
Portuguese male poets
20th-century male writers
21st-century male writers
Competitors at the 1978 All-Africa Games
African Games competitors for Angola
Portuguese people of Angolan descent